Zostera capricorni is a species of eelgrass in the Zosteraceae family. It is native to the seacoasts of New Guinea, Queensland, New South Wales, Victoria, South Australia, Norfolk Island and the North Island of New Zealand. It was first discovered at Moreton Bay in Queensland in 1875.

References

capricorni
Flora of Queensland
Flora of South Australia
Biota of the Pacific Ocean
Biota of the Indian Ocean
Flora of New South Wales
Flora of New Guinea
Flora of Victoria (Australia)
Flora of Norfolk Island
Flora of New Zealand
Plants described in 1876
Salt marsh plants
Taxa named by Paul Friedrich August Ascherson